Vous & moi is an acoustic album by French singer Julien Doré, released on 2 March 2018. It mostly consists of acoustic versions of songs from his fourth studio album &. The album peaked at number two in France and Wallonia.

Track listing

Charts

Certifications

Release history

References

2018 albums
Julien Doré albums
Sony Music France albums